Chorrillos Itapalluni is an archaeological site located near the town of Puno, Peru near Lake Titicaca. The site was used as a large silver ore processing site in the colonial period for the nearby silver mines at Laycacota and Cancharani. It is located just a few kilometers from the abandoned colonial mining town, the Asiento de San Luis de Alba. While it is sometimes still erroneously referred to as San Luis de Alba, it was never a large settlement, instead primarily associated with silver ore processing, crushing, and refining. 

Chorrillos is now protected by the Peruvian Ministry of Culture as an Asiento Minero cultural heritage site.

References 

Archaeology
Peru
Silver mining
Latin America
Puno